Orocrambus philpotti is a moth in the family Crambidae. It was described by David E. Gaskin in 1975. It is endemic to New Zealand, where it has been recorded in the Tasman Mountains to Lake Tekapo in the South Island. The habitat this species prefers consists of alpine and subalpine tussock grasslands.

The wingspan is 26–35 mm. The forewings are golden bronze-brown with a white median streak. The hindwings are whitish. Adults have been recorded on wing from December to February.

References

Crambinae
Moths described in 1975
Moths of New Zealand
Endemic fauna of New Zealand
Endemic moths of New Zealand